Oliva fulgurator is a species of sea snail, an olive snail, a marine gastropod mollusk in the family Olividae, the olives.
Subspecies
 Oliva fulgurator bullata Marrat, 1871
 Oliva fulgurator fulgurator (Röding, 1798)

Distribution
This marine species occurs in the Caribbean Sea and off the Lesser Antilles.

References

fulgurator
Gastropods described in 1798